In typical elections, Sudan elects on a national level head of state – the president – and a legislature. In the election of 2010, there were two presidential elections, one for the Presidency of the Republic of Sudan and one for the Presidency of the Government of Southern Sudan. Elections for the unicameral, 360-member National Assembly were last held in April 2015.

The National Legislature whose members were chosen in mid-2005 had two chambers. The National Assembly (Majlis Watani) consisted of 450 appointed members who represented the government, former rebels, and other opposition political parties. The Council of States (Majlis Welayat) had 50 members who were indirectly elected by state legislatures. All members of the National Legislature served six-year terms.

In the early twenty-first century, Sudan was a dominant-party state with the National Congress in power. Opposition parties were allowed, but were widely considered to have no real chance of gaining power.

On 11 April 2019, Sudan was taken over by a military junta after the military seized power from the President in a coup. Federal elections were tentatively scheduled for 2022 under the 2019 Sudanese transition to democracy deal.

History 
Sudan has had national level elections since 1948 while it was still an Anglo–Egyptian colony. Independence from or union with Egypt was a major electoral platform in the 1948 election.

Following the Comprehensive Peace Agreement, elections initially did not play a role in determining the composition of the interim national government, the South Sudan government, or the state legislatures. An out of date national census and, in the case of South Sudan, a complete lack of infrastructure for conducting an election, rendered the electoral process moot. As a result, all government officials and all governing bodies consisted of appointed officials until the completion of a census in 2008 and national elections in 2010. The SPLM rejected the results of the census, claiming that it underestimated populations in the South. The National Elections Act of 2008 provided the legal framework for conducting elections in Sudan, South Sudan, and in each state. The National Elections Commission was responsible for developing the regulations, rules, and orders for the election of the national president, South Sudan president, state governors, National Assembly, South Sudan Legislative Assembly, and state assemblies.

Latest elections

Presidential elections

Parliamentary elections

See also
Electoral calendar
Electoral system

References

External links
Adam Carr's Election Archive
African Elections Database
Elections and the Probability of Violence in Sudan
Sudan Electionnaire
sudanvotes.com
Electoral Designs: Representation, Proportionality and Constituency Boundaries in Sudan's 2010 Elections